Bernardo da Costa Sassetti Pais (24 June 1970 – 10 May 2012) was a Portuguese jazz pianist and film composer.

Sassetti was born in Lisbon. He was a great-grandson of Sidónio Pais, President of the First Republic. He initially played guitar, then began studying piano and music theory at age nine. He became interested in jazz after hearing Bill Evans. By the late 1980s, he was backing visiting musicians and teaching jazz piano in Lisbon (and, later, taught throughout other lusophonic areas). During the 1990s, he worked in London, where he recorded three albums with Guy Barker's group. Anthony Minghella invited them to appear as the Napoli Jazz Sextet in The Talented Mr. Ripley.

His 2006 album Unreal: Sidewalk Cartoon received a four-star rating (of a possible four) in The Penguin Guide to Jazz (9th ed.), and was selected for The Penguin Jazz Guide: The History of the Music in the 1000 Best Albums.

In addition to his jazz work, Sassetti has composed numerous film scores.

Bernardo Sassetti was married to actress Beatriz Batarda, with whom he had two daughters.

He died on 10 May 2012 after falling off a cliff in Guincho Cascais (Portugal), where he was shooting pictures for his next book.

Discography
 Mundos (Universal Music Portugal, 1996)
 Olhar with Carlos Barretto, Mario Barreiros, Perico Sambeat (Beat Up, 1999)
 Specifics 45: Cuba Cuba with Guy Barker (Music House, 2000)
 Salsetti (West Wind, 2000)
 Nocturno (Clean Feed, 2002)
 Mario Laginha Bernardo Sassetti (ONC Produções Culturais, 2003)
 Indigo (Clean Feed, 2004)
 Alice (Trem Azul, 2005)
 Unreal: Sidewalk Cartoon (Clean Feed, 2006)
 3 Pianos with Mario Laginha, Pedro Burmester (Sony, 2007)
 Dúvida (Trem Azul, 2007)
 Second Life (Original Soundtrack) (Utopia Música, 2009)
 Palace Ghosts and Drunken Hymns with Will Holshouser (Clean Feed, 2009)
 Um Amor De Perdição (Trem Azul, 2009)
 Carlos Do Carmo Bernardo Sassetti (Universal Music Portugal, 2010)

Filmography
 Second Life (2009) composer
 Os Grandes Portugueses (2007) (TV) .... Himself
 Antes de Amanhã (2007) composer
 98 Octanas (2006) composer
 Alice (2005) composer
 A Costa dos Murmúrios (2004) composer
 O Milagre segundo Salomé (2004) composer
 Maria E as Outras (2004) composer
 Quaresma (2003) composer
 Aniversário (2000) (TV) composer
 Facas e Anjos (2000) (TV) composer
 O Segredo (2000) composer
 As Terças da Bailarina Gorda (2000) composer
 Maria do Mar (1930) (2000) composer
 The Talented Mr. Ripley (1999) – pianist (Napoli Jazz Sextet)
 Mundo VIP (2 episodes, Show nº 12 and Show nº 197, 1996-2000) – Himself

References

External links 
 Music: Composer Bernardo Sassetti dead at age 41 – Portugal -Portuguese American Journal
 En Homenaje a Bernardo Sassetti - Cuadernos de Jazz. Alejandro Cifuentes

1970 births
2012 deaths
People from Lisbon
20th-century male musicians
20th-century pianists
Deaths from falls
Male film score composers
Male jazz musicians
Male pianists
Portuguese film score composers
Portuguese jazz pianists
Portuguese people of Italian descent
Clean Feed Records artists